"Pilat" is an episode of the Filipino drama anthology series Maalaala Mo Kaya (MMK). It stars Angel Locsin and Sam Milby and it aired on ABS-CBN in the Philippines on October 19, 2007.

Plot
Abandoned by their mother, and burdened with an ailing father, Melody (Angel Locsin) has to put aside her dreams and act as both mother and father to her family. She works as an assistant for a wealthy doctor. Melody experiences humiliation from her employer's family, who suspect her enthusiasm for her work.

Cast

Main
Angel Locsin as Melody
Sam Milby as Jeffrey

Supporting
Ronnie Lazaro as Noel (Melody's father)
Chanda Romero as Estella (Jeffrey's stepmother)
Juan Rodrigo as Dr. Sanchez (Jeffrey's father)
Janus Del Prado as Mayong (Melody's older brother)
Raquel Monteza as Esmeralda (Melody's mother)
Cheska Billiones as Luisa (Melody's sister)

Awards
24th Star Awards for Television - Angel Locsin Winner for Best Single Performance by an Actress.

References

External links

Maalaala Mo Kaya episodes
2007 Philippine television episodes